Zhantoro Zholdoshevich Satybaldiyev (born 6 January 1956) is a Kyrgyz politician who was Prime Minister of Kyrgyzstan from September 2012 until March 2014.

Early life and education
Satybaldiyev was born in Osh, Soviet Union in 1956. He holds a bachelor's degree engineering and construction from Frunze Polytechnic Institute’s which he received in 1979.

Career
The Parliament of Kyrgyzstan elected Satybaldiyev as prime minister on 5 September 2012 by a 111-2 margin. His election came after the coalition of the previous Prime Minister Omurbek Babanov collapsed in August, following allegations of corruption and a sharp contraction in 5% GDP between January and July 2012.

Activities
Widely seen as a technocrat, Satybaldiyev was elected to restore order and bring back investment and confidence to Kyrgyzstan.

One of the most pressing issues of the Prime Minister faced is the growing calls for the nationalization by the Ata-Zhurt party of the Kumtor Gold Mine. The gold mine owned by the Canadian company Centerra Gold, is one of the most important contributors to Kyrgyzstan's economy, adding nearly 12% to the national GDP. The economic contraction that had been seen over the previous months was largely in response to a drop in output by the mine. The Prime Minister faced growing criticism from the poorer, more nationalist south of the country, especially from Jalal-Abad. However, Satybaldiyev traveled to the mine on 1 October 2012 and gave assurances that it would not be nationalized. Some observers noted that to make good on promises of reducing poverty, nationalization of this company would not make sense.

On 30 May 2013 protesters stormed the mine demanding its nationalization, 50 people were injured. In response Satybaldiyev stated that the government would find ways to increase revenues from the mine, whether they be through taxes or otherwise.

Post-premiership 
Satybaldiev was sentenced to seven years in prison on corruption charges stemming from his involvement in a 2013 project to modernize the Bishkek Thermal Power Station. It is alleged that several Kyrgyz officials lobbied on behalf of a Chinese company which performed shoddy work, resulting in the devastating failure of the city’s heating and power systems on the coldest day of 2018.

References

External links
Cabinet of ministers of the Kyrgyz republic

1956 births
Living people
Prime Ministers of Kyrgyzstan
People from Osh
Kyrgyz Technical University alumni